Rose Marie or Rose-Marie is the title of the following films, all based on the 1924 light operetta-style Broadway musical Rose-Marie:

Rose-Marie (1928 film), directed by Lucien Hubbard, and starring Joan Crawford, James Murray and House Peters
Rose Marie (1936 film), directed by W. S. Van Dyke, and featuring frequent co-stars Jeanette MacDonald and Nelson Eddy, as well as Reginald Owen 
Rose Marie (1954 film), with director Mervyn LeRoy and stars Ann Blyth, Howard Keel and Fernando Lamas